In enzymology, an UDP-2-acetamido-4-amino-2,4,6-trideoxyglucose transaminase is an enzyme that catalyzes the chemical reaction

UDP-2-acetamido-4-amino-2,4,6-trideoxyglucose + 2-oxoglutarate  UDP-2-acetamido-4-dehydro-2,6-dideoxyglucose + L-glutamate

Thus, the two substrates of this enzyme are UDP-2-acetamido-4-amino-2,4,6-trideoxyglucose and 2-oxoglutarate, whereas its two products are UDP-2-acetamido-4-dehydro-2,6-dideoxyglucose and L-glutamate.

This enzyme belongs to the family of transferases, specifically the transaminases, which transfer nitrogenous groups.  The systematic name of this enzyme class is UDP-2-acetamido-4-amino-2,4,6-trideoxyglucose:2-oxoglutarate aminotransferase. Other names in common use include uridine diphospho-4-amino-2-acetamido-2,4,6-trideoxyglucose, and aminotransferase.  It employs one cofactor, pyridoxal phosphate.

References

 

EC 2.6.1
Pyridoxal phosphate enzymes
Enzymes of unknown structure